Luiz Carlos Ferreira (born 22 October 1958), known as Luizinho, is a Brazilian former footballer who played as a defender.

Career 
During his career which spanned the years from 1975 to 1996 he played initially for Villa Nova of Nova Lima, before he moved to the state capital Belo Horizonte where he won with Atlético Mineiro between 1978 and 1989 eight times the State Championship of Minas Gerais.

After a three-year spell from 1989 until 1992 in Portugal with Sporting CP of Lisbon he returned to Brazil and won the 1993 Brazilian Cup with Cruzeiro and in 1994 once more the Campeonato Mineiro.

For the Brazil national football team he played from August 1980 to June 1983 in 32 international matches, scoring two goals. He also played in all of the five matches of Brazil in the 1982 World Cup in Spain, including the memorable match in which Italy prevailed in the match to progress into the semifinal. Luizinho was selected for the All Star Team of the tournament as best player in his position.

Honours

Club 
 Copa do Brasil: 1993
 Campeonato Mineiro: (9) 1978–1982, 1985, 1986, 1989, 1994

Individual 
 Bola de Prata: 1980, 1987
 FIFA World Cup All-Star Team: 1982

References

External links 

1958 births
Living people
Brazilian footballers
Brazilian expatriate footballers
Association football defenders
Expatriate footballers in Portugal
Brazilian expatriate sportspeople in Portugal
Campeonato Brasileiro Série A players
Primeira Liga players
1982 FIFA World Cup players
Brazil international footballers
Villa Nova Atlético Clube players
Clube Atlético Mineiro players
Cruzeiro Esporte Clube players
Sporting CP footballers